Kurt Bestor (born 1958) is an American keyboardist and composer specializing in new-age, film scores, and jazz. He is known for his instrumental Christmas arrangements. His best-known songs are "Prayer of the Children", "Mama Don't You Weep". He is also known for composing music for the 1993 movie Rigoletto, and for writing music for the 2002 Salt Lake City Olympic games, as well as various official the Church of Jesus Christ of Latter-day Saints videos.

A longtime Utah resident, Bestor plays concerts in Salt Lake City and the Western states.

Childhood years
Kurt Bestor was born in 1958 in Waukesha, Wisconsin. He took piano lessons from his mother as a child. His grandpa played the trumpet in Western Big bands and his uncle played with the trumpet in Jack Benny's band. Later on Kurt Bestor and his family moved to Orem, Utah in 1966, where he attended Orem High School and learned how to play the trumpet. When Bestor watched the 1975 film Jaws, he later recalled "I knew that's what I wanted to do when I saw Jaws during high school. I have made a goal to score films ever since." He decided to compose soundtracks for movies which he went on to do for The Buttercream Gang and Rigoletto. He was also influenced by classical music.

College years
In 1977 Bestor and his family joined the Church of Jesus Christ of Latter-day Saints. He later went on a two-year religious mission in Yugoslavia, where he observed social problems such as homelessness and poverty. The Yugoslav Wars of the 1990s would later inspire his song "Prayer of the Children." After his mission, Bestor married his first wife Melodie.

Bestor attended Brigham Young University to write his songs for student projects, and also composed music for the Sundance Institute's composer lab. He ultimately dropped out of Brigham Young University college to pursue a full-time musical career.

Music career (1980-today)

In his early 20s, Kurt began working as a trumpet player and arranger at the Osmond TV Studios in Orem, Utah. He performed for a number of TV shows, TV specials, and early productions of the "Children's Miracle Network Telethon." He also provided arrangements for these productions. Also, during this time, Kurt and his colleague Sam Cardon were hired to composed and produce a large library of commercial jingles. This provided Kurt his first opportunity to create and arrange a large amount of music on a deadline, which would help him greatly as he later pursued his film scoring career.

Bestor was awarded an Emmy for his collaboration with Sam Cardon on the original music for ABC's coverage of the 1988 Winter Olympics. This provided his first record company "Airus Records" to encourage Kurt to produce his first Christmas album.

In the fall of 1988, Kurt Bestor released An Airus Christmas Volume 1 on cassette and CD. It was a career success for Bestor, and spawned his first live Christmas concert, held at Abravanel Hall in Salt Lake City. Kurt Bestor's Christmas music received national radio airplay in the late 1980s and early 1990s, and continues to be heard today during seasonal broadcast periods. He later went on to release Joyspring, Seasons, Evening Angels, An Airus Christmas Volume 2, and Innovators which featured Kurt's best-known composition "Prayer of the Children". He also released Noel Christmas Volume 3 and the album Sketches with the song Mama Don't You Weep. He also created film music for LDS Church videos, and composed the soundtrack for the 1993 movie Rigoletto and the 2000 cartoon movie "The Scarecrow". Kurt also composed for albums such as Innovators II and composed music for the Salt Lake City 2002 Winter Olympics.

Kurt Bestor still performs his "Kurt Bestor Christmas" Concerts, held now at the Eccles Theatre in Salt Lake City. In December 2018, Kurt completed his 31st consecutive year of these performances. He also performs a series of concerts each year over the Christmas holidays at the Egyptian Theater in Park City, Utah.

In 2014, Bestor released his first music video to accompany his song "Baroque Coco" from his album, Kurt Bestor and the Collective; Outside the Lines.

Personal life
Bestor's 20-year marriage to first wife Melodie ended in 1999, and a hasty second marriage ended in 2001 after just a few months. Balancing career obligations with family duties became difficult and created distance between Bestor and his children, Kristin and Erika, both of whom were born with spina bifida, a spinal defect that causes partial paralysis and other disabilities.

In January 2003, Bestor married Petrina, a Kenyan-born safari guide who moved to Utah after serving as an assistant to Robert Redford on the set of Out of Africa.

Discography

Albums
1988: Joyspring
1989: Seasons
1990: Joyspring II
1993: Innovators
1994: Evening Angels
1996: Timpanogos - A Prayer for Mountain Grace / Utah: 5 Sacred Lessons
1997: Sketches
1998: Fathers
1999: The Dance
2002: Innovators II
2005: A Life (ep)
2014: Outside the Lines

Christmas albums
1988: An Airus Christmas volume 1 (later known as Kurt Bestor Christmas volume 1 in 1996)
1991: An Airus Christmas volume 2 (later known as Kurt Bestor Christmas volume 2 in 1996)
1995: Christmas (later known as Noel in 1997)
1999: One Silent Night
2002: A Kurt Bestor Christmas - By Request 
2016: Comes a Christmas Morning
2020: Christmas Time Is Here

Soundtracks and scores
1989: A More Perfect Union: America Becomes a Nation
1990: The Witching of Ben Wagner
1991: In Your Wildest Dreams
1991: The Seventh Brother
1992: Split Infinity
1992: The Buttercream Gang
1993: Rigoletto
1993: The Buttercream Gang in Secret of Treasure Mountain
1995: Behind the Waterfall
1995: Unspoken Song - A Celebration of 100 Years of Utah Spirit (with Sam Cardon)
1995: UTAH - Musical Spectacular (with Sam Cardon)
1998: Sedona - Spirit of Wonder
1998: No More Baths
1998: The Ghost of Dickens past
1999: New Testament soundtrack
1999: Book of Mormon soundtrack
1999: Doctrine and Covenants soundtrack 
2000: The Scarecrow
2000: The Lamb of God / Passion of the Lamb
2001: Saints of the Seas
2008: The Great American West

References

Sources
 Kurt Bestors official website.

 Chasing his muse has given him much turmoil.
 How composer Kurt Bestor found his own Christmas groove
 Kurt Bestors Biography at Famous Mormons website.
 Kurt Bestor goes multimedia with his first music video.

1958 births
Living people
Latter Day Saints from Wisconsin
American jazz composers
American male jazz composers
Converts to Mormonism
Latter Day Saints from Utah